Events in 1965 in animation.

Events

February
 February 27: Friz Freleng and Hawley Pratt's The Wild Chase produced by Warner Bros. Cartoons, is released.

March
 March 20: The anime film Gulliver's Travels Beyond the Moon, by Masao Kuroda and Sanae Yamamoto, premieres.

April
 April 3: David Detiege's The Man from Button Willow premieres.
 April 5: 37th Academy Awards: 
 Mary Poppins wins the Academy Award for Best Actress (Julie Andrews), Academy Award for Best Original Score (the entire soundtrack), the Academy Award for Best Original Song ("Chim Chim Cher-ee"), the Academy Award for Best Film Editing (Cotton Warburton), and the Academy Award for Best Special Visual Effects (done by Peter Ellenshaw, Eustace Lycett and Hamilton Luske).
 Friz Freleng, Hawley Pratt and David DePatie's The Pink Phink wins the Academy Award for Best Animated Short.

June
 June 6: The first episode of Osamu Tezuka's The Amazing 3 airs.
 June 23: Rankin/Bass Productions releases Willy McBean and his Magic Machine.

September
 September 9: The first episode of Hanna-Barbera's The Atom Ant/Secret Squirrel Show airs.
 September 11: The first episode of Roger Ramjet airs.
 September 25: The Beatles, based on the popular British band the Beatles, debuts on ABC.
 September 30: The first episode of Thunderbirds airs.

October
 October 1: 
 The Flintstones episode "The Return of Stony Curtis" is first broadcast, guest starring Tony Curtis as Stony Curtis.
 Bruno Bozzetto's West and Soda premieres.
 October 6: The first episode of Kimba the White Lion, based on Osamu Tezuka's manga series, airs.
 October 9: The first episode of Milton the Monster airs.
 October 22: The Flintstones episode Samantha is first broadcast, guest starring Elizabeth Montgomery and Dick York playing their characters from Bewitched.

December
 December 9: A Charlie Brown Christmas, the first Peanuts animated special, airs on CBS. This Christmas special will become a holiday classic.

Specific date unknown
 Belvision releases the film Les Aventures des Schtroumpfs, directed by Eddy Ryssack, based on Peyo's The Smurfs. The picture is an anthology film of five earlier Smurfs shorts.
 The first episode of Pojďte pane, budeme si hrát, aka Hey Mister, Let's Play! airs.
 Arthur Lipsett's A Trip Down Memory Lane premieres.
 Gene Deitch's Nudnik debuts in the animated short Here's Nudnik.

Films released 

 January 1 - Shounen Ninja Kaze no Fujimaru: Dai Saru Taiji (Japan)
 January 3 - Treasure Island Revisited (Japan)
 March 20: 
 Gulliver's Travels Beyond the Moon (Japan)
 Shounen Ninja Kaze no Fujimaru: Ma Boroshi Majutsu-dan (Japan)
 April 3 - The Man from Button Willow (United States)
 June 23 - Willy McBean and His Magic Machine (United States, Canada and Japan)
 October 1 - West and Soda (Italy)
 November 23:  
 Donald Duck Goes West (United States)
 December 22 - Pinocchio in Outer Space (Belgium and United States)
 Specific date unknown:  
 Les Aventures des Schtroumpfs (Belgium)
 The Edgar Bergen & Charlie McCarthy Show (United States and Japan)

Television series 

 January 7 - Super Jetter Mirai Kawa Kita Shonen debuts on TV Tokyo.
 February 1 - Uchû Patrol Hoppa debuts on NET (now TV Asahi).
 April 2 - Perman debuts on TBS.
 April 4 - Dolphin Ôji debuts on Fuji TV.
 April 8 - Uchûjin Pipi debuts on NHK.
 May 4 - Uchû Shônen Soran debuts on Fuji TV.
 May 8 - Space Ace debuts on Fuji TV.
 June 3 - Prince Planet debuts on FNS (Fuji TV).
 June 6 - The Amazing 3 debuts on Fuji TV.
 July 29 - The Pogles debuts on BBC.
 August 23 - The Astronut Show debuts on CBS.
 August 29 - Obake no Q-tarō debuts on TBS.
 September 9 - The Atom Ant/Secret Squirrel Show debuts on NBC.
 September 11 - Sinbad Jr. and his Magic Belt debuts in syndication.
 September 25 - The Beatles debuts on ABC, Australian Broadcasting Corporation, and ITV.
 October (specific date unknown) - The New 3 Stooges debuts in syndication.
 October 2 - Atom Ant, Precious Pupp, Secret Squirrel, Squiddly Diddly, The Hillbilly Bears, and Winsome Witch debut on NBC.
 October 6 - Kimba the White Lion debuts on Fuji TV.
 October 9 - Milton the Monster debuts on ABC.
 October 23 - Roger Ramjet debuts in syndication.
 November 1 - Hustle Punch debuts on TV Asahi.
 December 14 - Tatakae! Osper debuts on NTV.
 Specific date unknown: 
 Captain Fathom, DoDo, The Kid from Outer Space, and JOT (TV series) debut in syndication.

Births

January
 January 1: Jennifer Hale, Canadian-American actress (voice of Ivy in Where on Earth is Carmen Sandiego, Felicia Hardy/Black Cat in Spider-Man, Jessie Bannon in season 2 of The Real Adventures of Jonny Quest, Princess Morbucks, Ms. Keane, and Sedusa in The Powerpuff Girls, Thorn in Scooby-Doo, Mary Jane Watson in Spider-Man Unlimited, Sam and Mandy in Totally Spies, Numbuh 86 in Codename: Kids Next Door, Giganta in Justice League and Justice League Unlimited, Kyoshi in Avatar: The Last Airbender and The Legend of Korra, Aayla Secura in Star Wars: The Clone Wars, Jean Grey in Wolverine and the X-Men, Zatanna, Poison Ivy, and Killer Frost in Batman: The Brave and the Bold, Captain Marvel in The Avengers: Earth's Mightiest Heroes, Rojo in Ben 10: Omniverse, continued voice of Aurora and Cinderella).
 January 7: John Ondrasik, American singer-songwriter and pianist (voice of Captain Hero's Father in the Drawn Together episode "Little Orphan Hero").
 January 10: Butch Hartman, American animator (An American Tail, Ruby-Spears Enterprises, CatDog), storyboard artist (Hanna-Barbera, Disney Television Animation, Jumanji, Annabelle's Wish, The New Woody Woodpecker Show), writer (Johnny Bravo, The Adventures of Jimmy Neutron, Boy Genius), director (Johnny Bravo) and producer (creator of The Fairly OddParents, Danny Phantom, T.U.F.F. Puppy, Bunsen Is a Beast and HobbyKids Adventures).
 January 12: Rob Zombie, American musician, songwriter, filmmaker (The Haunted World of El Superbeasto) and actor (voice of the Lizard in the Spider-Man: The New Animated Series episode "Law of the Jungle", Ichthultu in the Justice League episode "The Terror Beyond", Ordutheus in the Mr. Pickles episode "Vegans").
 January 13: Paul Greenberg, Canadian-American voice actor (voice of Prissypeo in Thumb Wars: The Phantom Cuticle, Yolkian Guard in Jimmy Neutron: Boy Genius, Brobot and Ooblar in The Adventures of Jimmy Neutron, Boy Genius, Brett in The Ant Bully, Mr. Bump and Mr. Quiet in The Mr. Men Show, Aubrey in Back at the Barnyard, Barno in The Wild Thornberrys episode "Bad Company", Naked Mole Rat Expert in the As Told by Ginger episode "Family Therapy", various characters in Yo-kai Watch) and screenwriter (As Told by Ginger, Yakkity Yak, Rugrats Go Wild, Yvon of the Yukon, Tupu, Jibber Jabber, Kung Fu Dino Posse).
 January 22: Diane Lane, American actress (voice of Riley's Mom in Inside Out).
 January 27: Alan Cumming, Scottish actor (voice of the Devil in God, the Devil and Bob, Interpreter in Robot Chicken, Chuck, Rupert and Zeke in Rick & Steve: The Happiest Gay Couple in All the World, Adolf Hitler and Braveheart in Jackboots on Whitehall, Gutsy Smurf in The Smurfs, The Smurfs: The Legend of Smurfy Hollow and The Smurfs 2, Bog King in Strange Magic, Generalissimo Meriweather in Michael Jackson's Halloween, Owen in The Prince, John Castaway in the Gargoyles episode "The Journey", Rumpledkiltskin in the Courage the Cowardly Dog episode "Rumpledkiltskin", the White Rabbit in the Dora the Explorer episode "Dora in Wonderland", Sebastian Winkeplotz in the Arthur episode "Show Off", Loki in The Simpsons episode "Bart's in Jail!").
 January 31: Dylan Beach, American former child actor (voice of Charlie Brown in It's Arbor Day, Charlie Brown), (d. 2008).

February
 February 7: Chris Rock, American comedian, actor, and filmmaker (voice of the title character in Osmosis Jones, Marty in the Madagascar franchise, Mooseblood in Bee Movie).
 February 9: Keith Wickham, English actor (voice of Professor Inkling in Octonauts, Bungo in Jungle Junction, Frank in The Koala Brothers).
 February 12: David J. Steinberg, American actor (portrayed the SpongeBob Hallucination in the live-action segment of the SpongeBob SquarePants episode "Atlantis SquarePantis"), (d. 2010).
 February 21: Emily Michels, American animator (The Simpsons, The Ren & Stimpy Show, Hey Arnold!), storyboard artist (Little Dracula), character designer (Little Dracula, The Addams Family, Madeline) and prop designer (Madeline).
 February 23: Vincent Chalvon-Demersay, French producer (co-creator of Totally Spies).

March
 March 8: Satoru Akahori, Japanese screenwriter (Tekkaman Blade, Video Girl Ai).
 March 9: Mike Pollock, American voice actor and radio personality (voice of Doctor Eggman in Sonic X and Sonic Boom).
 March 11:
 Wallace Langham, American actor (voice of Andy French in Mission Hill, Anarky in Beware the Batman, Sven in The Wild Thornberrys episode "Pal Joey", Prince Bobby in the Happily Ever After: Fairy Tales for Every Child episode "The Frog Princess", Basil Karlo / Clayface in The Batman episode "Clayfaces", Ocean Master in the Batman: The Brave and the Bold episode "Evil Under the Sea!", Tyler in the Ben 10: Alien Force episode "Inside Man").
 Andy Sturmer, American musician and composer (Warner Bros. Animation, Disney Television Animation, performed the second theme of The Batman).
 March 16: Masaaki Yuasa, Japanese director (Lu over the Wall, Devilman crybaby), screenwriter, and animator; co-founder of Science Saru.
 March 18:
 Yul Vazquez, Cuban-American actor and musician (voice of Gibson Mouse in The Adventures of Tom Thumb and Thumbelina, additional voices in Courage the Cowardly Dog).
 Joe Suggs, American animator (A Wish for Wings That Work, Taz-Mania, The Swan Princess, The Critic, What a Cartoon!, Timon & Pumbaa, Space Ghost Coast to Coast, The King and I, Futurama, The Oblongs), storyboard artist (Rocko's Modern Life, Rugrats, 2 Stupid Dogs, Space Jam, 101 Dalmatians: The Series, The Lionhearts, Futurama, Dilbert, Grandma Got Run Over by a Reindeer) and writer (Rocko's Modern Life).
 March 19: Jeff Pidgeon, American animator (The Butter Battle Book, Tiny Toon Adventures, The Simpsons, Taz-Mania), character designer (Bakshi Animation, FernGully: The Last Rainforest), storyboard artist, screenwriter and voice actor (Pixar).
 March 23: Richard Grieco, American actor (voice of Tony Dracon in Gargoyles, Ghost Rider in Fantastic Four and The Incredible Hulk).
 March 27: Eric Horsted, American television writer (Futurama, Fanboy & Chum Chum, The Simpsons, Disenchantment).
 March 30: Juliet Landau, American actress (voice of Verdona, Helen Wheels, and Natalie Tennyson in the Ben 10 franchise, Drusa in Green Lantern: The Animated Series, Zatanna in the Justice League Unlimited episode "The Balance").
 March 31: Steven T. Seagle, American comic book writer, producer (Man of Action Entertainment, Marvel Animation, Zagtoon, Mega Man: Fully Charged), and voice actor (voice of Orangutank and Ice Crusher in Power Players).

April
 April 12: Konstantin Bronzit, Russian director and animator (Lavatory – Lovestory, We Can't Live Without Cosmos).
 April 16: Jon Cryer, American actor (voice of Felix Faust in Justice League Action, Freakshow in Danny Phantom, Clifton and Dave in Stripperella, Joel Stein in Hey Joel, the Winged Wolves in the Hercules episode "Hercules and the Underworld Takeover", Brainy Smurf in the Robot Chicken episode "Your Mouth Is Hanging off Your Face").
 April 20:
 Evan Dorkin, American comic book artist, cartoonist and television writer (Space Ghost Coast to Coast, Superman: The Animated Series, Batman Beyond, Crayon Shin-chan, Ben 10, creator of Welcome to Eltingville).
 Magnus Carlsson, Swedish illustrator, cartoonist, director and animator.
 April 26: Kevin James, American actor, comedian and screenwriter (voice of Officer Landers in Monster House, Otis in Barnyard, Frankenstein in the Hotel Transylvania franchise).
 April 30: Adrian Pasdar, American actor (voice of Iron Man in Avengers Assemble, Ultimate Spider-Man, Hulk and the Agents of S.M.A.S.H., and the Phineas and Ferb episode "Phineas and Ferb: Mission Marvel", Hawkeye in The Super Hero Squad Show, Micronus Prime in Transformers: Robots in Disguise, Mr. Chase in Milo Murphy's Law).

May
 May 8:
 Monique Beatty, American television producer (DreamWorks Animation Television, Nickelodeon Animation Studio, Project G.e.e.K.e.R., Extreme Ghostbusters, Toonsylvania, Mike, Lu & Og, Stripperella).
 Glen Wuthrich, American animator (The Simpsons) and background artist (Edith Ann: Homeless Go Home, King of the Hill, The Simpsons).
 May 10: Kiyoyuki Yanada, Japanese voice actor (voice of Andromon in the Digimon franchise) and animation director (Perfect Blue), (d. 2022).
 May 16: Christopher Ayres, American actor and ADR director (Funimation), (d. 2021).
 May 18: Teddy Castellucci, American film composer (Eight Crazy Nights).
 May 19: Maile Flanagan, American actress and comedian (voice of Naruto in the Naruto franchise, Piggley Winks in Jakers! The Adventures of Piggley Winks, JR Elephant in Pig Goat Banana Cricket, Lucky in Rango, Macy in Back at the Barnyard).
 May 20: Dan Yaccarino, American author, illustrator and producer (creator of Oswald and Doug Unplugs).
 May 23:
 Kappei Yamaguchi, Japanese actor (voice of the title character in Ranma ½, Jimmy Kudo in Case Closed, Jin in YuYu Hakusho, Usopp in One Piece, Teddie in Persona 4: The Animation, Flappy in Futari wa Pretty Cure Splash Star).
 Marcello Magni, Italian actor (continued voice of the title character and other various characters in Pingu), (d. 2022).
 May 24: 
 John C. Reilly, American actor (voice of Ralph in the Wreck-It Ralph franchise, Eddie in Sing, 5 in 9, Kiyomasa Oiwa in When Marnie Was There).
 Shinichiro Watanabe, Japanese animation director (Cowboy Bebop, Samurai Champloo).
 May 30: Iginio Straffi, Italian animator (Winx Club, Huntik: Secrets & Seekers).
 May 31: Brooke Shields, American actress and model (voice of Miss Spider in Miss Spider's Sunny Patch Kids, Carol Ferris in Justice League: The New Frontier, Ruby Bear in The Goldilocks and the 3 Bears Show, Mrs. Goodman in Mr. Pickles and Momma Named Me Sheriff, Seraphina in Creative Galaxy, Julie in The Batman episode "Riddler's Revenge", Witch in the Wonder Pets! episode "In the Land of Oz", herself in The Simpsons episode "The Front").

June
 June 6: Megumi Ogata, Japanese actress, voice actress, and singer (voice of Shinji Ikari in Neon Genesis Evangelion, Yugi Mutou in Yu-Gi-Oh!, Makoto Naegi and Nagito Komaeda in Danganronpa, Kurama in YuYu Hakusho, Sailor Uranus in Sailor Moon, Hanako and Tsukasa in Toilet-Bound Hanako-kun, Yukito Tsukishiro and Yue in Cardcaptor Sakura, Yuta Okkotsu in Jujutsu Kaisen 0).
 June 8: Kevin Farley, American actor, comedian, writer, producer and director (voice of Panda Express Panda in Eight Crazy Nights, Henchman #1 in Stripperella, Babe Bonfiglio, Carl, Patient, Gene and Dick Sawitzki in F Is for Family).
 June 19: 
 Greg Tiernan, Canadian-Irish animator and film and television director (Nitrogen Studios).
 Sean Marshall, American former actor and singer (portrayed Pete in Pete's Dragon, voice of the Boy in The Small One).
 June 23: Andy Houts, American animator, production assistant (Bobby's World, The Simpsons, Klasky Csupo), writer (Rugrats, Rocko's Modern Life) and actor (voice of various characters in Rugrats, Policeman in Duckman, Sloolup, Schnill and Butch in Aaahh!!! Real Monsters), (d. 1997).
 June 26: Bobs Gannaway, American screenwriter (2 Stupid Dogs, Cats Don't Dance), producer and director (Disney Television Animation, Disneytoon Studios).
 June 28: Sonny Strait, American actor (voice of Krillin in Dragon Ball, Maes Hughes in Fullmetal Alchemist, Koro-sensei in Assassination Classroom, Present Mic in My Hero Academia, original voice of TOM in Toonami).

July
 July 8: Nick Jennings, American animator, background artist (Nickelodeon Animation Studio, The Brave Little Toaster to the Rescue, The Brave Little Toaster Goes to Mars, Oh Yeah! Cartoons, Cartoon Network Studios), art director (Rocko's Modern Life, SpongeBob SquarePants, Adventure Time), writer (Rocko's Modern Life), director and producer (Tak and the Power of Juju, Adventure Time, The Powerpuff Girls).
 July 14: Juli Hashiguchi, American animator (Rugrats, Cool World, The Thief and the Cobbler), storyboard artist (Rugrats), sheet timer (Klasky Csupo, Film Roman, Nickelodeon Animation Studio, Happily Ever After: Fairy Tales for Every Child, Family Guy, Dragon Tales, Disney Television Animation, What's New, Scooby-Doo?, Cartoon Network Studios, Curious George, American Dad!, Napoleon Dynamite, Full English, NFL Rush Zone, Dawn of the Croods, Guardians of the Galaxy, Big Mouth, Paradise PD, The Great North, HouseBroken, Farzar) and director (The Mask: Animated Series, The Story of Santa Claus, Nickelodeon Animation Studio, Cartoon Network Studios).
 July 23: Allison Abbate, American film producer and animator (Walt Disney Animation Studios, Warner Bros. Animation).
 July 24: Kadeem Hardison, American actor (voice of Adam Evans / Rubberband Man in Static Shock, Clown in the Happily Ever After: Fairy Tales for Every Child episode "The Steadfast Tin Soldier", Goki in the Captain Planet and the Planeteers episode "Gorillas Will Be Missed").
 July 26: Jeremy Piven, American actor (voice of Rock Rivers in Scooby-Doo! in Where's My Mummy?, Harv in Cars, Black Bellamy in The Pirates! In an Adventure with Scientists!, Elongated Man in Justice League Unlimited, Roland Gaines in the Spider-Man: The New Animated Series episode "Mind Games", Brain Pod #57 in the Buzz Lightyear of Star Command episode "Star Crossed").
 July 30: Greg Kibler, American telecine colorist (Universal Animation Studios, Nickelodeon Animation Studio, Hoops & Yoyo Ruin Christmas).

August
 August 6: Yuki Kajiura, Japanese composer (Puella Magi Madoka Magica, Sword Art Online).
 August 7: Jon Jon Briones, Filipino-American actor (voice of Hank in Trese, Alex Malto in Transformers: EarthSpark).
 August 10: Claudia Christian, American actress, singer and author (voice of Helga Sinclair in Atlantis: The Lost Empire, Queen Aquareine in The Oz Kids, Hera in Blood of Zeus).
 August 18: Ikue Ōtani, Japanese voice actress and singer (voice of Pikachu in the Pokémon franchise, Obiru in Flint the Time Detective, Tony Tony Chopper in One Piece, Koryu in Inuyasha, the title character in Zatch Bell!, Oshare in Hamtaro, Sora Hasegawa in Oh My Goddess!, Konohamaru Sarutobi in Naruto: Shippuden, Terara in Sgt. Frog, Candy in Smile PreCure!, Morgana in Persona 5: The Animation, Yokai Kozo in Dororo, dub voice of Dot Warner in Animaniacs, Chomper in The Land Before Time, Apple Bloom in My Little Pony: Friendship Is Magic, Dennis in the Hotel Transylvania franchise, and Little My in Moominvalley).
 August 19: Kyra Sedgwick, American actress (voice of Batwoman in Batman: Mystery of the Batwoman, Lois Lane in Justice League: The New Frontier).
 August 20: Tom Yasumi, Japanese-born American animator (The Legend of Prince Valiant), character designer, background artist (Rugrats), sheet timer (Nickelodeon Animation Studio, Clarence, Animaniacs, The Great North, Central Park) and director (Nickelodeon Animation Studio).
 August 21: Sean Gallimore, American animator (Thumbelina, A Troll in Central Park, The Pagemaster, Walt Disney Animation Studios, Looney Tunes: Back in Action, Space Jam: A New Legacy), (d. 2021).
 August 26: Nancy Kruse, American animator (The Critic, Walt Disney Animation Studios), writer (Get a Horse!, Encanto) and director (The Simpsons).
 August 28: Satoshi Tajiri, Japanese video game designer and director (creator of Pokémon, co-founder of Game Freak).
 August 29: Seán Cullen, Canadian actor and comedian (voice of Mayor Shelbourne and Tim Lockwood in Cloudy with a Chance of Meatballs, Piggy in Almost Naked Animals, Principal Barrage in Detentionaire, Fartor in Grossology, Four, Five, and Seven in Seven Little Monsters, Hydronormous in Atomic Puppet, Emperor Brainlius in Oh No! It's an Alien Invasion).
 August 30: Benoît di Sabatino, French animation producer (co-founder of MoonScoop).

September
 September 7: Hiroki Takahashi, Japanese actor (voice of Eiji Kikumaru in The Prince of Tennis, Hisoka in Hunter × Hunter, Katsuya Jonouchi in Yu-Gi-Oh! Duel Monsters, Japan in Hetalia: Axis Powers, Pisard in Futari wa Pretty Cure, Tobias in Pokémon).
 September 14: Shawn Patterson, American songwriter (wrote the song "Everything Is Awesome" for The Lego Movie) and composer (Nickelodeon Animation Studio, Project G.e.e.K.e.R., Dave the Barbarian, Titan Maximum, Robot Chicken, Mad, The High Fructose Adventures of Annoying Orange, The Adventures of Puss in Boots).
 September 28: Scott Fellows, American television writer and producer (Nickelodeon, The Adventures of Rocky and Bullwinkle, creator of Johnny Test and Supernoobs).

October
 October 7: Andy Luckey, American animator, artist, author, designer, director, illustrator and television producer (Teenage Mutant Ninja Turtles, Adventures from the Book of Virtues).
 October 8: C. J. Ramone, American musician and member of the Ramones (voiced himself in The Simpsons episode "Rosebud").
 October 13: Bill Odenkirk, American television writer, producer and brother of Bob Odenkirk (Futurama, The Simpsons, Disenchantment).
 October 18: Ralph Eggleston, American animator (Family Dog, Garfield: His 9 Lives, Computer Warriors, FernGully: The Last Rainforest), storyboard artist (The Simpsons), art director (FernGully: The Last Rainforest, Walt Disney Animation Studios), production designer, writer and film director (Pixar), (d. 2022).
 October 31: Rob Rackstraw, English actor (voice of Kwazii in Octonauts, Buster in The Koala Brothers, Mr. Gruber in The Amazing World of Gumball, Chuckie Chan in Chop Socky Chooks, King Axalotyl and Princess Syllabob in The Heroic Quest of the Valiant Prince Ivandoe).

November
 November 7: Mike Henry, American actor (original voice of Cleveland Brown in Family Guy and The Cleveland Show).
 November 12: Lex Lang, American actor (voice of Goemon Ishikawa XIII in Lupin the Third, Sagara Sanosuke in Ruroni Kenshin, Goku in Dragon Ball Super, Jagged Stone in Miraculous: Tales of Ladybug & Cat Noir, Doctor Doom in The Avengers: Earth's Mightiest Heroes, Clayface, Metallo, and Hamilton Hill in The Batman episode "The Batman/Superman Story").
 November 20: Mike Diamond, American musician and member of the Beastie Boys (voiced himself in the Futurama episode "Hell Is Other Robots").
 November 21: Magnus Fiennes, English songwriter, record producer and composer (Casper's Scare School, Freefonix).
 November 22: 
 Sam Fell, British animator, director, screenwriter, and voice actor (Flushed Away, The Tale of Despereaux, Paranorman).
 Sen Dog, Cuban-American rapper, musician and member of Cypress Hill (voiced himself in The Simpsons episode "Homerpalooza").
 November 24:
 Brian K. Roberts, American television director, writer and editor (The Simpsons).
 Run Wrake, British animator and film director (Rabbit), (d. 2012).
 November 26: Scott Adsit, American actor (voice of Clay Puppington in Moral Orel, Baymax in the Big Hero 6 franchise).
 November 30: Ben Stiller, American actor and comedian (voice of Alex in the Madagascar franchise, Bernard in Megamind, Harry Medfly in Duckman, Thomas Jefferson in Liberty's Kids, Khaka Peü Peü in the Phineas and Ferb episode "The Beak", Garth Motherloving in The Simpsons episode "Sweets and Sour Marge", Rich in the King of the Hill episode "That's What She Said", himself in the Space Ghost Coast to Coast episode "Rio Ghosto", the Family Guy episode "No Meals on Wheels", and the Dr. Katz, Professional Therapist episode "Ticket").

December
 December 3:
 Andrew Stanton, American animator, storyboard artist (2 Stupid Dogs, Timon & Pumbaa), film director, screenwriter (Mighty Mouse: The New Adventures), producer and voice actor (Pixar).
 Steve Harris, American actor (voice of Ethan Bennett / Clayface in The Batman, Makai in The Wild Thornberrys episode "Critics Masai", Sports Coach Hero in the Higglytown Heroes episode "Havin' a Ball").
 December 4: Veronica Taylor, American voice actress (voice of Ash Ketchum, Delia Ketchum, and May in seasons 1-8 of Pokémon, Amelia in Slayers, Brianne de Chateau/Ribrianne in Dragon Ball Super, Max Talor in Dinosaur King, Nico Robin in the 4Kids dub of One Piece, Setsuna Meioh / Sailor Pluto in the Viz Media dub of Sailor Moon, April O'Neil in Teenage Mutant Ninja Turtles, Sheep in WordWorld).
 December 5: John Rzeznik, American musician and member of the Goo Goo Dolls (composed and performed the songs "I'm Still Here" and "Always Know Where You Are" from Treasure Planet).
 December 16: J. B. Smoove, American actor and comedian (voice of Bebop in Teenage Mutant Ninja Turtles, Phil in 3Below: Tales of Arcadia, Frank in Harley Quinn, Black Manta in Teen Titans Go!, DJ Kwanzaa in The Simpsons episode "Angry Dad: The Movie", B. A. Baracus and Satan in the Robot Chicken episode "Crushed by a Steamroller on My 53rd Birthday").
 December 17: Jessica Gee-George, American actress (voice of Holbrook in Little Witch Academia, Petz in Sailor Moon, Mylène Haprèle and Daizzi in Miraculous: Tales of Ladybug & Cat Noir, Sassafras in Zak Storm).
 December 23: Martin Kratt, American zoologist and television producer (created and voiced himself in Wild Kratts).
 December 25:
 Susie Dietter, American animator (Rugrats, Rocko's Modern Life, Looney Tunes), storyboard artist (Recess, Open Season, Duck Duck Goose, Ella Bella Bingo, Bless the Harts, Rumble, Beavis and Butt-Head Do the Universe) and director (The Simpsons, The Critic, Recess, Futurama, Baby Blues, Brickleberry).
 Anna Dewdney, American author and illustrator (creator of Llama Llama), (d. 2016).

Specific date unknown
 Bob Anderson, American director (The Simpsons).
 Jim Reardon, American animator, storyboard artist (Mighty Mouse: The New Adventures, The Butter Battle Book), writer (Mighty Mouse: The New Adventures, Tiny Toon Adventures, WALL-E, Walt Disney Animation Studios) and director (Bring Me the Head of Charlie Brown, The Simpsons).
 Chip Wass, American animator, graphic designer and illustrator (designed the Nicktoons Network logo, provided graphic design for Shorty McShorts' Shorts).
 Isabelle de Catalogne, French television writer (Space Goofs, Fly Tales, Fish 'n' Chips).
 Gianluigi Toccafondo, Italian animator (Le criminel, La pista del maiale, Pinocchio, Little Russia, animated the Scott Free logo).
 Pamela Ross, American production manager (Doug, 101 Dalmatians: The Series, The Cramp Twins) and producer (Time Warp Trio, Tutenstein), (d. 2020).
 Jerry Richardson, American animator, storyboard artist, background artist, prop designer and art director (Bobby's World, The Simpsons, Klasky Csupo, Nickelodeon Animation Studio, Adelaide Productions, Futurama, Cartoon Network Studios, Disney Television Animation, Warner Bros. Animation, Brickleberry), (d. 2018).
 Edgar Larrazábal, American animator, storyboard artist (Hey Arnold!, Rugrats, Duncanville), sheet timer (Nickelodeon Animation Studio, Futurama, Cartoon Network Studios, DreamWorks Animation Television, Big Mouth, Disenchantment, Curious George, The Owl House, Duncanville, Chicago Party Aunt) and director (SpongeBob SquarePants).

Deaths

February
 February 19: Florence Gill, British actress (voice of Clara Cluck, and the title character in The Wise Little Hen), dies at age 86.
 February 26: Ladislas Starevich, Polish-Russian animator (The Beautiful Leukanida, The Night Before Christmas, Le Roman de Renard (The Tale of the Fox)), dies at age 82.

April
 April 22: Harvey Eisenberg, American animator and comics artist (MGM Animation, Hanna-Barbera), dies at age 53.

June
 June 22: Mikhail Tsekhanovsky, Russian illustrator, animator and film director (Post, The Tale of the Priest and of his Workman Balda, The Tale of the Fisherman and the Fish, The Frog Princess, The Wild Swans), dies at age 76.

August
 August 6: Everett Sloane, American actor (voice of the title character in The Dick Tracy Show), commits suicide at age 55.
 August 24: Joshua Meador, American animator, film director and special effects artist (Walt Disney Studios, Forbidden Planet), dies at age 54.

September
 September 16: Fred Quimby, American film producer (MGM), dies at age 79.

October
 October 13: Connie Rasinski, American animator and film director (Hansel and Gretel, Terrytoons), dies at age 58.

December
 December 12: Johnny Lee, American singer, dancer and actor (voice of Br'er Rabbit in Song of the South), dies from a heart attack at age 67.

See also
1965 in anime

References

External links 
Animated works of the year, listed in the IMDb

 
1960s in animation